Charlotte Emma Moore Sitterly (September 24, 1898 – March 3, 1990) was an American astronomer. She is known for her extensive spectroscopic studies of the Sun and chemical elements. Her tables of data are known for their reliability and are still used regularly.

Early life and education

Charlotte Moore was born to George W. and Elizabeth Walton Moore in Ercildoun, Pennsylvania, a small village near Coatesville. Her father was the Superintendent of Schools for Chester County and her mother was a schoolteacher. Her parents were Quakers and Charlotte was a lifelong member of Fallowfield Friends Meeting.

She attended Swarthmore College, where she participated in many extracurricular activities such as ice hockey, student government, glee club, and tutoring.  In order to pay her tuition, Moore was a substitute teacher, one of the few ways she thought she could work her way through college. She wanted to pursue a career outside teaching because "I did not enjoy the teaching that I did from first grade through high school. I succeeded at it, but I didn’t like it; it was too wearing."

Moore graduated from Swarthmore in 1920 with a Bachelor of Arts degree in mathematics and went on to Princeton to work as a human computer.

Career
On the recommendation of her mathematics professor at Swarthmore, John. Miller, Moore obtained a job at the Princeton University Observatory working for Professor Henry Norris Russell as a human computer carrying out calculations needed to use photographic plates in determining the position of the Moon. While working for Russel, Moore initially felt nervous about her inexperience, but over time her interest in astrophysics began to blossom.  Russell and Moore researched binary stars and stellar mass, and published extensively on the subject over the years of their collaboration. Her research included an effort to classify 2500 stars based on their spectra.

Although she spent five years at Princeton working under Russell, he refused to consider her a PhD, an unexceptional fact since there were no women in any of Princeton's graduate programs until 1961. Moore said “I was used to prejudice against women because Princeton was a man's stronghold, and a woman was really out of step there.” Though in 1926, Russell left his own name off a paper they worked on together and used hers alone.  

After five years at Princeton, Moore took a leave of absence due to ill health and she moved to the Mount Wilson Observatory as part of an ongoing collaboration between Russell and research groups there. While at Mount Wilson she worked extensively on solar spectroscopy, analyzing the spectral lines of the Sun and thereby identifying the chemical elements in the Sun. With her collaborators, she analyzed the spectra of sunspots. Moore was able to deduce the temperature of sunspots to be about 4,700 degrees kelvin. Her pictures from the Mount Wilson Observatory helped redetermine the new International Angstrom scale. 

She earned a Ph.D. in astronomy in 1931 from the University of California, Berkeley, which had more relaxed rules on women graduates than Princeton, on a Lick Fellowship. Princeton still did not accept women - and would not for the next 30 years. While working on her Ph.D, she continued researching spectroscopy and collected and analyzed data about the spectra of chemical elements and molecules. After obtaining her Ph.D, she returned to Princeton to continue work with Russell as a research assistant.

One of her most significant contributions to physics was her identification of technetium in sunlight, the first example of technetium naturally existing. She joined the then National Bureau of Standards (NBS) in 1945. Her tables of atomic spectra and energy levels, published by NBS, have remained essential references in spectroscopy for decades. While there, she began to research the infrared solar spectrum and atomic energy levels. Beginning in 1946, Moore was able to extend her work on ultraviolet spectral lines thanks to the work of Richard Tousey and measurements taken on V-2 rockets; prior to this Moore's studies were limited to telescopic observations partially blocked by the earth's atmosphere. Moore collaborated with Tousey for decades and led to her 1950 publication "Ultraviolet Multiplet Table."

In 1949 she became the first woman elected as an associate of the Royal Astronomical Society of Great Britain, in honor of her work on multiplet tablets and in identifying solar spot electra. Throughout her career she authored and co-authored over 100 papers and attended the tenth general assembly of the International Astronomical Union on the Joint Commission on Spectroscopy in Moscow in 1958. Sitterly retired from her position at the NBS when she turned 70, in 1968, but continued her research at the Naval Research Laboratory. Sitterly was honored by the Journal of the Optical Society of America by a commemorative issue in 1988.

Photographs from the Utrecht astronomy symposium 1963

Personal life
While working at Princeton in the 1920s, she met physicist Bancroft W. Sitterly, whom she eventually married on May 30, 1937. She continued to publish journals under her maiden name because most of her recognition was under that name. She believed that traveling is one of the most important aspects of a scientist's life, as it promotes collaboration between scientists. She enjoyed gardening, traveling, and music with her husband until his death in 1977. She continued her research until her death from heart failure at the age of 91.

Honors
Awards
Annie J. Cannon Award (1937)
Fellow of the Optical Society (1959) - member of the first class of OSA Fellows, one of only five women in the class of 115.
Federal Woman's Award (1961)
William F. Meggers Award of the Optical Society (1972)
Bruce Medal (1990)
Service
 Vice President, American Astronomical Society
 Vice President, American Association for the Advancement of Science Section D
 President, Commission on Fundamental Spectroscopic Data, International Astronomical Union
Named after her
Asteroid 2110 Moore-Sitterly

Works
A Multiplet Table of Astrophysical Interest, 1933 
The Solar Spectrum  (with Harold D. Babcock), 1947
The Masses of the Stars (with Henry Norris Russell), 1940 
Ultraviolet Multiplet Table, 1950 
Atomic Energy Levels as Derived from the Analyses of Optical Spectra, 1958

Further reading
BAAS Obituary
Bibliography from the Astronomical Society of the Pacific
"Oral History Transcript — Dr. Charlotte Moore Sitterly", American Institute of Physics.

Biography from Smithsonian Magazine

References

American women astronomers
1898 births
1990 deaths
Recipients of the Annie J. Cannon Award in Astronomy
Swarthmore College alumni
People from Chester County, Pennsylvania
20th-century American astronomers
20th-century American women scientists
Fellows of Optica (society)